"I Found Out" is the first single from English indie rock band the Pigeon Detectives' debut album, Wait for Me (2007). The track was re-recorded for the 2007 single release with the Smiths and Blur producer Stephen Street. Officially there are three versions of the track. The album version was slightly re-mixed from the original single version along with the Stephen Street version. The 2007 re-release had different artwork from the 2006 release along with brand new B-sides. The first release reached  39 on the UK Top 40 chart while the re-release peaked at No. 42.

Track listings

2006 release
CD (DTTR018CD)
 "I Found Out"
 "Left Alone"
 "Hello (My Old Friend)"

7-inch version 1 (DTTR018)
 "I Found Out"
 "Left Alone"

7-inch version 2 (DTTR018VL)
 "I Found Out"
 "Hello (My Old Friend)"

2007 release
CD (DTTR040CD)
 "I Found Out" (new version)
 "I Need You"
 "Take Her Back" (Andy Hillier's Hot Jazz Aces)

'''7-inch (DTTR040)
 "I Found Out" (new version)
 "I'm Not the One"

Charts

Certifications

References

2006 singles
2006 songs
The Pigeon Detectives songs
Song recordings produced by Stephen Street
UK Independent Singles Chart number-one singles